Martin Jennings, FRBS (born 31 July 1957) is a British sculptor who works in the figurative tradition, in bronze and stone. His statue of John Betjeman at St Pancras railway station was unveiled in 2007 and the statue of Philip Larkin at Hull Paragon Interchange station was presented in 2010. His statue of Mary Seacole (2016), one of his largest works, stands in the grounds of St Thomas' Hospital in central London, looking over the Thames towards the Houses of Parliament.

On 30 September 2022, the Royal Mint unveiled Jennings' design for the obverse portrait of King Charles III for Britain's coinage. A "digitally re-lit" version of the portrait will be used by the Royal Mail on the stamps bearing the image of Charles III.

Early life
Jennings was born in 1957. From 1976 to 1979, he was a student of English Literature and Language at the University of Oxford, after which he took a City & Guilds course in Lettering (1979–80). From 1980 to 1983 he was apprenticed to Richard Kindersley for architectural lettering.

Notable works
Jennings created a bronze monument commemorating the pioneer plastic surgeon Sir Archibald McIndoe which was unveiled in June 2014 in the High Street, East Grinstead. Jennings' own father, Michael Jennings, a tank commander badly injured near Eindhoven in 1944, was treated for burns by McIndoe's team during the war. The monument depicts McIndoe standing behind and resting his hands reassuringly on the shoulders of a seated airman, who has burned hands clawed together, and a scarred face turned to one side. The figures are encircled by a stone bench.

Also in 2014, Jennings completed a bronze statue of Charles Dickens, which was unveiled in Guildhall Square, Portsmouth, the city of the author's birth.

In June 2016, two statues by Jennings were installed. The first paid tribute to the women who worked in the armaments industry during the Second World War and was sited in front of Sheffield's City Hall. For Women of Steel Jennings was given the Public Monuments and Sculpture Association's 2017 Marsh Award for Excellence in Public Sculpture. The second commemorated Crimean War nurse Mary Seacole and was sited in front of St Thomas' Hospital in London. Both of these were unveiled at a time when the paucity of monuments to women across the country was being publicly discussed. The making of the Jennings statue was recorded in the ITV documentary David Harewood: In the Shadow of Mary Seacole (2016) along with her life story.

In November 2017, Jennings' statue of George Orwell was unveiled outside Broadcasting House, headquarters of the BBC, in London. This won Jennings a second Marsh award – but also Private Eyes "Sir Hugh Casson Award" for 2017's ugliest new building.

Work in public collections
The National Portrait Gallery in London has three portraits by Jennings; Edward Heath, Philip Pullman and Lord Bingham.

Portraits of Jennings
The National Portrait Gallery collection has a 2001 photographic portrait of Jennings by Norman McBeath.

Personal life
Jennings is based in the Cotswolds, near Stroud. He is a Fellow of the Royal Society of Sculptors.

References

External links

 

1957 births
People from Chichester
Living people
English male sculptors
English engravers
Coin designers
British currency designers
People educated at Ampleforth College
Artists from Oxford
21st-century male artists
Fellows of the Royal British Society of Sculptors